2:00 AM Paradise Cafe is the tenth studio album by singer-songwriter Barry Manilow released in 1984. The album peaked at No. 28 on the Billboard 200 and went Gold in the United States.

Background
Johnny Mercer's widow, Ginger, entrusted Manilow with a cache of Mercer's lyrics that had never been set to music, although Manilow used only Mercer's "When October Goes" for the project. He recruited veteran jazz musicians Bill Mays, Gerry Mulligan, Shelly Manne, Mundell Lowe, and George Duvivier for the album.  Also enlisted for vocal duets were Mel Tormé and Sarah Vaughan.  The entire album was rehearsed for three days, then recorded entirely live (in one take) without overdubs at Westlake Studio 'C' in Los Angeles, California.

Track listing

Charts

Personnel
Barry Manilow – vocals, keyboards, piano
Mel Tormé – vocals
Sarah Vaughan – vocals
Bill Mays – piano, Fender Rhodes
Gerry Mulligan – baritone saxophone
Mundell Lowe – electric guitar, acoustic guitar
George Duvivier – double bass
Shelly Manne – drums, percussion

Production
Arranged and produced by Barry Manilow
Recorded and engineered by Michael Braunstein
Assistant Engineers: Deni King, Greg Laney

Certifications

References

Barry Manilow albums
1984 albums
Arista Records albums